The 1963 Football Championship of Ukrainian SSR (Class B) was the 33rd season of association football competition of the Ukrainian SSR, which was part of the Ukrainian Class B. It was the thirteenth in the Ukrainian Class B. 

The 1963 Football Championship of Ukrainian SSR (Class B) was won by SKA Odessa.

There was reorganization of professional football competitions with Class A being expanded by adding extra tier and all Class B competitions including in Ukraine were moved to the third tier. Due to reorganization 35 out of 39 teams were relegated to lower tier by continuing to compete in the Ukrainian Class B competitions.

Format
The Ukrainian Republican competition consisted of two zones of 20 clubs. Upon conclusion of the league format each club qualified for a playoff with another club that placed the same place in the other group. The pair of the first placed clubs was sort of a republican championship playoff. The playoffs consisted of two legs - home and away. Note teams were relegated or withdrawn and only one was promoted to the Subgroup A (the First League).

Location map

Zone 1

Relegated teams
 none

Promoted teams
 FC Dnipro Kremenchuk – (debut, champion of Poltava Oblast in 1962)

Relocated and renamed teams
 FC Zirka Kirovohrad was last year known as FC Dynamo Kirovohrad
 FC Budivelnyk Kherson was last year known as FC Mayak Kherson
 FC Spartak Ivano-Frankivsk was last year known as FC Spartak Stanislav

League's standing

Zone 2

Relegated teams
 none

Promoted teams
 FC Burevisnyk Melitopol – (debut)
 FC Metalurh Komunarsk – (debut, champion of Luhansk Oblast in 1962)
 FC Metalurh Yenakiyeve – (debut, champion of Donetsk Oblast in 1962)
 FC Metalurh Kerch – (debut, champion of Crimean Oblast in 1962)

Relocated and renamed teams
 SC Tavriya Simferopol was last year known as FC Avanhard Simferopol
 FC Spartak Sumy was last year known as FC Avanhard Sumy

League's standing

Play-offs 
Each team played against the same ranking team from the other zone. Only the two top pairs that really mattered concerning promotion are listed next. No teams were relegated. SKA Odessa obtained the promotion from the Ukraine zone. They were classified as the Republican champions and were promoted to the Inter-Republican level, the Class A.

 FC Lokomotyv Vinnytsia - SKA Odessa 0:2 0:1
 FC Azovstal Zhdanov - SKA Lviv 0:0 1:0
 FC Zirka Kirovohrad - FC Torpedo Kharkiv 1:1 0:2
 FC Burevisnyk Melitopol - FC Polissya Zhytomyr 1:0 1:3
 FC Avanhard Ternopil - FC Shakhtar Horlivka 1:1 0:0
 FC Kolhospnyk Cherkasy - FC Khimik Severodonetsk 2:1 0:2
 FC Lokomotyv Donetsk - SKA Kyiv 0:2 1:2
 FC Budivelnyk Kherson - FC Shakhtar Kadiivka 3:2 0:2
 FC Dynamo Khmelnytsky - FC Kolhospnyk Poltava 5:1 0:1
 FC Arsenal Kyiv - FC Dniprovets Dniprodzerzhynsk 3:2 1:2
 FC Desna Chernihiv - FC Metalurh Kommunarsk 3:1 1:2
 SC Navy Sevastopol - FC Spartak Ivano-Frankivsk 2:1 1:4
 FC Verkhovyna Uzhhorod - FC Trubnyk Nikopol 0:0 1:2
 FC Avanhard Zhovti Vody - FC Sudnobudivnyk Mykolaiv 1:1 1:0
 FC Avanhard Chernivtsi - SC Tavriya Simferopol 6:0 0:1
 FC Avanhard Kramatorsk - FC Shakhtar Oleksandriya 1:1 0:2
 FC Volyn Lutsk - FC Hirnyk Kryvyi Rih 0:0 0:3
 FC Kolhospnyk Rivne - FC Metalurh Yenakieve 3:1 2:2
 FC Metalurh Kerch - FC Naftovyk Drohobych 0:1 0:0
 FC Dnipro Kremenchuk - FC Spartak Sumy 0:0 0:2

Relegation play-offs 
 FC Metalurh Yenakieve – FC Shakhtar Chystyakove 1:0 2:0

See also
 Soviet Second League

External links
 1963 season regulations.  Luhansk football portal
 1963 Soviet championships (all leagues) at helmsoccer.narod.ru

1963
3
Soviet
Soviet
football
Football Championship of the Ukrainian SSR